Three Hills Airport  is located  east southeast of Three Hills, Alberta, Canada.

The Prairie Aviation Training Centre (PATC), an affiliate of Prairie College, utilizes this airport as its training base. PATC offers a two-year Associate of Arts in Mission Aviation degree to successful graduates of the program.

References

External links
Place to Fly on COPA's Places to Fly airport directory

Registered aerodromes in Alberta
Kneehill County